Squidoo was a revenue-sharing article-writing site.  Articles were called "lenses".  In 2010, the site consisted of 1.5 million lenses . On August 15, 2014, founder Seth Godin announced that HubPages had acquired Squidoo.

History
Development started in 2005. The launch team consisted of Seth Godin, his book editor Megan Casey, former Fast Company employee Heath Row, Corey Brown, and Gil Hildebrand, Jr. The first version was developed by Viget Labs.

Site structure
Squidoo was a user-generated Web site which allowed users to create multimedia pages without an understanding of HTML. Godin called articles "lenses", because he saw them as  "[focusing] light and [showing] us what we need to see." Writers were called "lensmasters". In Squidoo's early stages, Godin noted that Martha Stewart and Jane Goodall's lenses did not receive large amounts of traffic, whereas lenses on myspace and the online game Line Rider were among the site's most successful.

Godin announced in January 2006 that the company would start a profit-sharing system whereby lensmasters would receive affiliate income from ads they placed in their lenses.

Reception
After its debut, Squidoo was profiled in CNN, The New York Times, MSNBC, and The Washington Post. The site was given top prize in South by Southwest's community/wiki category in 2007. Squidoo challenged established information Web sites like About.com and eHow for traffic, while it remained similar in unique visitor numbers to other revenue-sharing sites like  Mahalo.com and HubPages.

HubPages acquisition
On August 15, 2014, Godin announced that Squidoo had been acquired by HubPages in a friendly takeover. In common with many revenue-sharing sites, Squidoo's traffic and income had been declining for some time and if it had not been sold to HubPages, it would not have been financially viable to maintain the site.

In the announcement on the Squidoo site, Godin explained:

They’re [HubPages] the industry leader, continually pushing the envelope in terms of their content, its presentation, and the traffic and traction they get online. The best way we know to serve our users is to give them an even better place for their content, and when I talked with Paul Edmondson at HubPages, it became clear to both of us that combining these platforms leads to a stronger, more efficient, more generous way to share great stuff online.

Users were warned to save their pages, as only the top-performing Squidoo lenses would be transferred to HubPages.

References

Online publishing companies of the United States
Internet properties established in 2005
2014 mergers and acquisitions